Top Model, season 2 (or Top Model: Paris) was the second season of Top Model. It was broadcast on TV3 in Denmark, Norway and Sweden by Viasat from September to November 2005. The winner of the competition 17-year-old Frøydis Elvenes from Narvik. The runners-up were Anna Nørgaard from Højbjerg and Arwen Bergröm from Sundsvall.

Call-out order

  The contestant was eliminated
 The contestant won the competition

Norway's pre-selection
 Norway's competition was hosted by Kathrine Sørland, who was also the head judge until the three countries merged and Cynthia Garrett took over. The first episode was aired in Norway on 5 September 2005, with the finale being aired on 21 November. The first episode saw nine contestants selected for the competition. The final three girls chosen to compete in the final competition with Denmark and Sweden were Frøydis Elvenes, Karin Santini and Kristine Øverby. The last contestant standing was Elvenes, who went on to win the competition. As part of her prizes, Elvenes received a cover and multiple-page spread in FHM.

Final 9

Final 3

Denmark's pre-selection
Denmark's competition was hosted by Anne Pedersen who was also the head judge until the three countries merged and Cynthia Garrett took over. The first episode was aired in Denmark on 6 September 2005, with the finale being aired on 22 November. The first episode saw nine contestants selected for the competition. The final three girls chosen to compete in the final competition with Norway and Sweden were Anna Nørgaard, Louise Falkenblad and Tine Holm Riis. The last contestant standing was Nørgaard, who was runner-up overall.

Contestants
(ages stated are at start of contest)

Final 9

Final 3

Judges
Anne Pedersen (host)
Camilla Frank (Costume editor)
Helen Dohlman (runway show choreographer)
Jeppe Mydtskov (Unique Models)
Mariana Verkerk (guest judge, posing and catwalk coach)

Sweden's pre-selection
 Sweden's competition was hosted by Mini Andén, who was also the head judge until the three countries merged and Cynthia Garrett took over. The first episode was aired in Sweden on 14 September 2005, with the finale being aired on 30 November. The first episode saw nine contestants selected for the competition. The final three girls chosen to compete in the final competition with Denmark and Norway were Arwen Bergström, Janni Juntunen and Mikaela Källgren. The last contestant standing was Bergström, who was runner-up overall.

Contestants
(ages stated are at start of contest)

Final 9

Final 3

Photo shoot guide
Photo shoot 1: Workout in Paris
Photo shoot 2: In spider's web
Photo shoot 3: Water advert at the Eiffel Tower
Photo shoot 4: Disco balls & bags
Photo shoot 5: Angels & devils
Photo shoot 6: Marie Antoinette style in Versailles
Photo shoot 7: Bikinis in St. Tropez
Photo shoot 8: Group photo with dogs
Photo shoot 9: Moulin Rouge
Photo shoot 10: Eiffel Tower glamour

References

External links
Official website of Top Model Norge (archive at the Wayback Machine)
Official website of Top Model Danmark (archive at the Wayback Machine)

Scandinavia
2005 Danish television seasons
2005 Norwegian television seasons
2005 Swedish television seasons